Swords is a compilation album by Morrissey, released in the UK on 26 October 2009 and in the US on 3 November on Polydor. The album features 18 single B-sides collected from the preceding three Morrissey albums – You Are the Quarry (2004), Ringleader of the Tormentors (2006), and Years of Refusal (2009).  Morrissey issued a total of 24 studio B-sides during 2004–2009, as well as numerous live B-side tracks, making Swords an incomplete collection of his non-album work of the era. However, in his review of the album, Stephen Thomas Erlewine of allmusic.com notes that "Not all the flipsides are here, but all the noteworthy ones are."

Initial copies of the CD include a bonus disc of eight songs recorded live in Warsaw during Morrissey's 2009 tour. The compilation was supported by the Swords Tour, featuring dates in the UK, the Netherlands, France, Germany, Ireland, and the United States.

In a statement, Morrissey revealed that he had intended Swords to be a budget album, and was disappointed to see it be retailed for such a high price.

Track listing

Personnel

The band
 Morrissey – vocalist
 Alain Whyte – guitarist (tracks 1, 2, 3, 4, 6, 8, 10, 11, 12, 13, 15 and 16)
 Boz Boorer – guitarist
 Jesse Tobias – guitarist (tracks 1, 3, 4, 5, 8, 9, 11, 14, 17 and 18)
 Gary Day – bassist (tracks 1, 2, 3, 4, 6, 8, 10, 11, 12, 13, 15 and 16)
 Solomon Walker – bassist (tracks 5, 9, 14, 17 and 18)
 Matt Walker – drummer (tracks 5, 9, 14, 17 and 18)
 Dean Butterworth – drummer (tracks 2, 6, 10, 12, 13, 15 and 16)
 Matt Chamberlain – drummer (tracks 1 and 11)
 Michael Farrell – keyboards (tracks 1, 3, 4, 5, 7, 8, 11, 14 and 17)
 Roger Joseph Manning Jr. – keyboards (tracks 2, 6, 9, 10, 12, 13, 15, 16 and 18)

Additional credits
 Kristeen Young – additional vocals (track 7)
 Chrissie Hynde – backing vocals (track 9)
 Jerry Finn – producer (tracks 2, 5, 6, 9, 10 and 12–18)
 Tony Visconti – producer (tracks 1, 3, 4, 7, 8 and 11)
 Gustavo Santaolalla – producer (tracks 5 and 14)

References

Morrissey compilation albums
Albums produced by Tony Visconti
Albums produced by Jerry Finn
2009 compilation albums
Polydor Records compilation albums